Wayne Lester Smith (born May 9, 1957) is a former American football defensive back who played eight seasons in the National Football League (NFL). A graduate of Chicago's Harper High School, He was an 11th round selection (278th overall pick) in the 1980 NFL Draft by the Detroit Lions out of Purdue University. He would play for the Lions (1980–1982), the St. Louis Cardinals (1982–1986), and the Minnesota Vikings (1987). Wayne has two daughters, Cha-Chi and Chasaty Smith. He is married to Toi Robertson-Smith.

References

External links
 NFL.com player page

1957 births
Living people
American football defensive backs
Detroit Lions players
Minnesota Vikings players
Purdue Boilermakers football players
St. Louis Cardinals (football) players
Players of American football from Chicago
National Football League replacement players